In geometry, a pinch point or cuspidal point is a type of singular point on an algebraic surface.

The equation for the surface near a pinch point may be put in the form

For example the surface  near the point , meaning in coordinates vanishing at that point, has the form above. In fact, if  and  then {} is a system of coordinates vanishing at  then  is written in the canonical form.

The simplest example of a pinch point is the hypersurface defined by the equation  called Whitney umbrella.  

The pinch point (in this case the origin) is a limit of normal crossings singular points (the -axis in this case). These singular points are intimately related in the sense that in order to resolve the pinch point singularity one must blow-up the whole -axis and not only the pinch point.

See also
Whitney umbrella
Singular point of an algebraic variety

References

 

Algebraic surfaces
Singularity theory